Ibrahim Zaid Ali (born 15 April 1978), commonly known as Kuda Ibbe is a Maldivian singer and music composer.

Early life and career
Since childhood, Ali had been listening to all genres of songs from Bollywood classical to hip-hop to heavy metal music. At the age of seven, Ali fabricated music equipment including guitar and drum using wood, plywood and tin, where he used these self-made instruments to perform songs in the football stadium. His talent was recognized by a band member who visited his island for a show where this member gifted him with a real guitar. In 1997, during his vacation, Ali visited Male' where one of his family members, Ahmed Nihan, a music performer back then, introduced him to the world of The Beatles, Creedence Clearwater Revival, Iron Maiden, Metallica and Guns N' Roses. Before pursuing a career in music, Ali worked as a professional painter and artist developing banners and posters.

His first public stage performance was as a guitarist in the Hafthaa Show where prominent faces including Ali Rameez and Mezzo Mohamed Majid were star performers. In of the shows, he performed a Bollywood track of Sonu Nigam which caught the eyes of several music artists. During the time, Dhivehi Raajjeyge Adu was in the process of forming a music band titled "Waves Band". The band was formed in 2001 which also marks his career beginning by performing three tracks for the album Aimina. The following year he performed his breakthrough song "Edhemey Kalaayah" from the album Hithukooru which topped charts for many weeks.  Initially, scheduled to record the song in the voice of Mohamed Abdul Ghanee, it was later landed to Ali which he considered as his "biggest fortune" in his career.

Afterwards, Ali became one of the most sought after artists and was hired by several music directors and producers to perform songs and compose music for many studio albums, films, national songs and religious tracks. Initially, he was labelled as a composer "rehashing copy tunes" though later he was credited as one of the "prominent original music composers" of the nation where in 2018, the Government of Maldives honoured him with the National Award of Recognition, which he attributed as his biggest achievement.

Discography

Feature film

Short films

Television

Non-Film songs

Filmography

Accolades

References 

Living people
People from Malé
1978 births
Maldivian playback singers